Olejniczak is a Polish surname, it may refer to:
 Cezary Olejniczak (born 1972), Polish politician
 Dawid Olejniczak (born 1983), Polish tennis player
 Dominic Olejniczak (1908–1989), American mayor
 Janusz Olejniczak (born 1952), Polish pianist and actor
 Michał Olejniczak (born 2001), Polish handball player
 Stan Olejniczak (1912–1979), American football player
 Wojciech Olejniczak (born 1974), Polish politician

Polish-language surnames